| country              = United States
| num_episodes         = 
| network              = VH1
| first_aired          = 
| last_aired           = 
| prev_season      = Season 6
| next_season      = Season 8
| episode_list =
}}

The seventh season of the reality television series Black Ink Crew premiered on VH1 from September 19, 2018 until May 1, 2019. It chronicles the daily operations and staff drama at an African American-owned and operated tattoo shop in Harlem, New York.

Cast

Main
 Ceaser Emanuel
 Sky Day
 Donna Lombardi
 Ted Ruks
 Melody Mitchell (episodes 1–14)
 Walt Miller 
 Young Bae

Recurring
Miss Kitty
Jadah Blue 
Alex "The Vagina Slayer"
Tatiana
Tokie Renet
Des 
Genesis
O'S**t Duncan
Mama Bae
Krystal
Puma Robinson
Charmaine Walker

Guest 
Desiigner 
 Ace 
 Herb
 Rob — Bae's fiance.
 Nikki Duncan — O'S**t's wife.
 Kevin Laroy
 Dutchess Lattimore — Ceaser's ex.

Episodes

References

2018 American television seasons
2019 American television seasons
Black Ink Crew